Oudebaaskraal Dam is an earth-fill type dam located on the Tankwa River near Ceres, Western Cape, South Africa. It was established in 1969 and serves mainly for irrigation purposes. The hazard potential of the dam has been ranked significant (2).

Hundreds of pink flamingos can be spotted there at certain times, and the areas of the dam which are covered in algae have a kelp type smell similar to the ocean.

See also
List of reservoirs and dams in South Africa
List of rivers of South Africa

References 

 List of South African Dams from the Department of Water Affairs

Dams in South Africa
Dams completed in 1969